Poland competed at the 2013 Summer Universiade in Kazan, Russia represented by 230 athletes.

The team won 30 medals (9th place) including 5 gold medals (12th place).

Athletics

Badminton

Basketball

Women
The women's team will participate in Group A.

Beach volleyball

Canoeing

Chess

Diving

Fencing

Field hockey

The men's team will participate in Group A.

Gymnastics

Judo

Rowing

Rugby sevens

Sambo

Shooting

Swimming

Tennis

Volleyball

Weightlifting

Wrestling

References

Sport in Poland

2013
Nations at the 2013 Summer Universiade
2013 in Polish sport